Felicia Zimmermann (born August 16, 1975) is an American fencer. She competed in the women's individual and team foil events at the 1996 and 2000 Summer Olympics. Her sister Iris Zimmermann also competed at the Olympics as a fencer.

References

External links
 

1975 births
Living people
American female foil fencers
Olympic fencers of the United States
Fencers at the 1996 Summer Olympics
Fencers at the 2000 Summer Olympics
Sportspeople from Rochester, New York
Pan American Games medalists in fencing
Pan American Games silver medalists for the United States
Pan American Games bronze medalists for the United States
Fencers at the 1995 Pan American Games
Stanford Cardinal fencers
21st-century American women